Kenneth "Ken" Corbet (August 19, 1948) is Republican member of the Kansas House of Representatives, representing the 54th district (Topeka in Shawnee County, Kansas).

References

External links
"Ken Corbet", Ballotpedia

Republican Party members of the Kansas House of Representatives
Living people
21st-century American politicians
Place of birth missing (living people)
1948 births